The Newspaperman: The Life and Times of Ben Bradlee is an American documentary film that premiered on December 4, 2017 on HBO. Directed by John Maggio, the film explores the life and legacy of journalist Ben Bradlee.

Premise
The Newspaperman: The Life and Times of Ben Bradlee is "an intimate portrait of Bradlee that traces his ascent from a young Boston boy stricken with polio to one of the most consequential journalistic figures of the 20th century."

Persons featured
The documentary includes interviews with: 

 Bob Woodward
 Carl Bernstein
 Quinn Bradlee
 Courtland Milloy
 David Maraniss
 David Remnick
 Don Graham
 George Vaillant
 Henry Kissinger
 Ben Bradlee Jr.
 Jim Hoagland
 Jim Lehrer
 John Dean
 Norman Lear
 Richard Cohen
 Robert Kaiser
 Robert Redford
 Sally Bedell Smith
 Sally Quinn
 Tina Brown
 Tom Brokaw

Release

Marketing
On November 13, 2017, HBO released the first trailer for the film.

Premiere
On November 29, 2017, the film held its New York premiere at the HBO Screening Room in New York City.

Reception

Critical reception
The Newspaperman: The Life and Times of Ben Bradlee has been met with a positive response from critics. On the review aggregation website Rotten Tomatoes, the film holds a 94% approval rating with an average rating of 7.8 out of 10, based on 16 reviews. Metacritic, which uses a weighted average, assigned the film a score of 80 out of 100 based on 7 critics, indicating "generally favorable reviews".

In a positive review, The Hollywood Reporters Frank Scheck said, "Chronicling its subject's life and career in fascinating detail, The Newspaperman: The Life and Times of Ben Bradlee will prove catnip to journalism and political buffs, not to mention anyone who cares about the free press and its role in our democracy." Similarly complimentary, The Wall Street Journals Dorothy Rabinowitz said, "As any rational person would expect, the subject of HBO’s The Newspaperman: The Life and Times of Ben Bradlee--the executive editor who presided over the Washington Post’s coverage of the Watergate scandal that drove Richard Nixon from office--quickly emerges as a heroic figure. What’s not so expected, what comes as something bordering on shock, of a gratifying kind, is how much else the film takes on in this buoyant and mercilessly frank look at Bradlee’s life and career." In a more mixed review, Verne Gay of Newsday gave the film two and a half stars out of four and said, "In the argot of Bradlee’s glorious trade, “The Newspaperman” is a puff piece. That’s OK. Bradlee deserves one. He was the greatest editor of one of the world’s greatest newspapers who supervised a story that will forever grace the Valhalla of journalism. But the problem with puffery, however well-meaning, is that it obscures subtler, more complicated, perhaps less complimentary truths."

Accolades

See also
List of HBO Films films
The Post

References

External links

2017 films
American documentary films
HBO documentary films
2010s English-language films
2010s American films